Francesco Saverio Monticelli (1863–1927) was an Italian zoologist at the Zoological Museum of Naples (curator from 1900).

He was the taxonomic author of several families of parasites which are still recognized such as the Diplectanidae Monticelli, 1903 or the Plectanocotylidae Monticelli, 1903.

References 
 Monticelli, F.S. (1888) Saggio di una morfologia dei Trematodi. Google Books
 Monticelli, F.S. (1892) Cotylogaster Michaelis n g n sp. e revisione degli Aspidobothridae. Hathi Trust Digital Library
 Monticelli, F.S. (1893) Studii sui Trematodi endoparassiti: Primo contributo di osservazioni sui distomidi. PDF in BHL
 Monticelli, F.S. (1903) Per una nuova classificazione degli “Heterocotylea”. Monitore Zoologico Italiano, 14, 334–336.

Italian zoologists
1863 births
1927 deaths
Italian parasitologists